This is a list of diplomatic missions of Algeria. Algeria has a significant presence worldwide, with particular focus on Africa, the Middle East, and its former colonizer France.

Africa 

 Luanda (Embassy)

 Cotonou (Embassy)

 Ouagadougou (Embassy)

 Yaoundé (Embassy)

 N'Djamena (Embassy)

 Brazzaville (Embassy)

 Kinshasa (Embassy)

 Cairo (Embassy)

 Addis Ababa (Embassy)

 Libreville (Embassy)

 Accra (Embassy)

 Conakry (Embassy)

 Bissau (Embassy)

 Abidjan (Embassy)

 Nairobi (Embassy)

 Tripoli (Embassy)
 Sabha (Consulate)

 Antananarivo (Embassy)

 Bamako (Embassy)
 Gao (Consulate)

 Nouakchott (Embassy)

 Maputo (Embassy)

 Windhoek (Embassy)

 Niamey (Embassy)
 Agadez (Consulate)

 Abuja (Embassy)

 Kigali (Embassy)

 Dakar (Embassy)

 Pretoria (Embassy)

 Khartoum (Embassy)

 Dar es Salaam (Embassy)

 Tunis (Embassy)
 Gafsa (Consulate)
 Le Kef (Consulate)

 Kampala (Embassy)

 Lusaka (Embassy)

 Harare (Embassy)

Americas

 Buenos Aires (Embassy)

 Brasília (Embassy)

 Ottawa (Embassy)
 Montreal (Consulate-General)

 Santiago (Embassy)

 Bogotá (Embassy)

 Havana (Embassy)

 Quito (Embassy)

 Kingston (Embassy)

 Mexico City (Embassy)

 Lima (Embassy)

 Washington, D.C. (Embassy)
 New York City (Consulate-General)

 Caracas (Embassy)

Asia

 Baku (Embassy)

 Dhaka (Embassy)

 Manama (Embassy)

 Beijing (Embassy)

 New Delhi (Embassy)

 Jakarta (Embassy)

 Tehran (Embassy)

 Baghdad (Embassy)

 Tokyo (Embassy)

 Amman (Embassy)

 Kuwait City (Embassy)

 Beirut (Embassy)

 Kuala Lumpur (Embassy)

 Muscat (Embassy)

 Islamabad (Embassy)

 Doha (Embassy)

 Riyadh (Embassy)
 Jeddah (Consulate-General)

 Seoul (Embassy)

 Damascus (Embassy)

 Ankara (Embassy)
 Istanbul (Consulate-General)

 Abu Dhabi (Embassy)
 Dubai (Consulate)

 Tashkent (Embassy)

 Hanoi (Embassy)

 Sanaa (Embassy)

Europe

 Tirana (Embassy)

 Vienna (Embassy)

 Brussels (Embassy)
 
 Sarajevo (Embassy)

 Sofia (Embassy)

 Zagreb (Embassy)

 Prague (Embassy)

 Copenhagen (Embassy)

 Helsinki (Embassy)

 Paris (Embassy)
 Lille (Consulate-General)
 Lyon (Consulate-General)
 Marseilles (Consulate-General)
 Strasbourg (Consulate-General)
 Besançon (Consulate)
 Bobigny (Consulate)
 Bordeaux (Consulate)
 Créteil (Consulate)
 Grenoble (Consulate)
 Metz (Consulate)
 Montpellier (Consulate)
 Nanterre (Consulate)
 Nantes (Consulate)
 Nice (Consulate)
 Pontoise (Consulate)
 Saint-Étienne (Consulate)
 Toulouse (Consulate)

 Berlin (Embassy)
 Frankfurt (Consulate-General)

 Athens (Embassy)

 Budapest (Embassy)

 Dublin (Embassy)

 Rome (Embassy)
 Milan (Consulate-General)

 The Hague (Embassy)

 Oslo (Embassy)

 Warsaw (Embassy)

 Lisbon (Embassy)

 Bucharest (Embassy)

 Moscow (Embassy)

 Belgrade (Embassy)

 Madrid (Embassy)
 Alicante (Consulate-General)
 Barcelona (Consulate-General)

 Stockholm (Embassy)

 Bern (Embassy)
 Geneva (Consulate-General)

 Kyiv (Embassy)

 London (Embassy)

Oceania

 Canberra (Embassy)

Multilateral organisations
 African Union
Addis Ababa (Permanent Mission to the African Union)

Cairo (Permanent Mission to the Arab League)

Brussels (Permanent Mission to the European Union)

Geneva (Permanent Mission to the United Nations and other international organizations)
New York (Permanent Delegation to the United Nations)

Gallery

See also
Foreign relations of Algeria

References

  Ministry of Foreign Affairs of the People’s Democratic Republic of Algeria

 
Diplomatic missions
Algeria